Raymond Eric East (born 20 June 1947, in Manningtree) is an English former cricketer who played for Essex County Cricket Club.

One of the most popular characters to play county cricket in recent times, East is remembered as much for his on field wit as his fine slow left arm spin bowling.  For many years he formed an effective 'spin twin' partnership with David Acfield and helped his Essex teammates break their historic trophy drought to challenge at the top of county and one day cricket.

He played 405 matches for Essex from 1965 to 1984 and in 410 matches in all.   He took 1019 wickets at 25.72, with five wickets in an innings 49 times, ten in a match ten times and a career best of 8 for 30. He scored 7178 runs at 17.72 in the lower order, with one hundred (113) and held 256 catches. He took 269 list A one-day wickets at 24.59 with a best of 6–18, although he once went for 79 in 8 overs in a Sunday league match.He often contributed important runs from batting at 9 or 10 and once shared a century partnership with John Lever at Westcliff 

From 1984–88 he was captain/manager of Essex 2nd XI and he played for Suffolk in 1991 and 1992 and now coaches cricket at Ipswich School.

He was a member of the Derrick Robins XI that toured South Africa in 1973.

References
 

1947 births
Living people
Essex cricketers
English cricketers
Marylebone Cricket Club cricketers
Suffolk cricketers
Suffolk cricket captains
People from Tendring (district)
Sportspeople from Essex
D. H. Robins' XI cricketers